McLennan County is a county located on the Edwards Plateau in Central Texas. As of the 2020 census, its population was 260,579	. Its county seat and largest city is Waco. The U.S. census 2021 county population estimate is 263,115. The county is named for Neil McLennan, an early Scottish settler who worked to evict the Indians in frontier Texas. McLennan County is included in the Waco Metropolitan Statistical Area.

History

McLennan County was created by the Texas Legislature in 1850 out of Milam County.  The county seat, Waco, had been founded as an outpost of the Texas Rangers. It was laid out by George B. Erath, and was known by 1850 as Waco Village.

In the 1880s, pharmacist Charles Alderton developed the carbonated beverage that became known as Dr Pepper.  The Dr Pepper business was headquartered in Waco, until it moved to Dallas, Texas.  Waco is also home to the Dr Pepper Museum, housed in the 1906 building that was the first stand-alone facility used to bottle Dr Pepper.

According to local lore, the first sustained flight did not occur in Kitty Hawk, North Carolina, but just outside Tokio (a small community in McLennan County) by a man flying a gyrocopter.  During World War I, McLennan County was home to at least one military airfield, Rich Field. In the aftermath of World War I, when social tensions were high as veterans returned, white racial violence broke out against blacks. The county had 15 lynchings, the second-highest number of any county in the state. 

McLennan County's contributions to World War II include the reopening of Rich Field for use by the Air Force, and the opening of James Connally Air Force Base. The latter is now used as the TSTC Waco Airport and Texas State Technical College. County resident Doris Miller was awarded the Navy Cross for his heroism at Pearl Harbor; he was the first African American to earn such distinction.  Local man James Connally became known as a World War II fighter pilot.

County Courthouse
The current County Courthouse is located in the county seat, Waco, Texas, and is the county's fourth courthouse.  Completed in 1902 in the Beaux Arts Style, it is the next-to-last example of Architect James Riely Gordon's Texas courthouses. Of the eighteen he designed, thirteen remain standing.  The first county courthouse was completed in 1851 for $500, and was a two-story log cabin that was 30' x 30'. McLennan's second courthouse was a two-story brick building completed in 1857 for $11,000.  The third courthouse was styled after Second Empire by architect W.C. Dodson, and completed in 1877 at a cost of $24,894.50.

Institutions of higher education
In 1886, Baylor University relocated from Independence, Texas, to Waco and absorbed Waco University.  During the early 20th century, McLennan County was home to as many as five colleges. In addition to Baylor, the other colleges included the predecessor to what is now known as Texas Christian University (now in Fort Worth), Paul Quinn College (relocated since to Dallas), and two other short-lived colleges.

In the 1960s, the Texas Legislature authorized McLennan Community College, the first community college to use those words in the name.  Around the same time, what is now the flagship institution of Texas State Technical College was founded as James Connally Technical Institute, as a member of the Texas A&M University System. Today, Baylor, McLennan Community College, and Texas State Technical College continue to operate in McLennan County. They educate a large portion of the college-bound high-school graduates from the county and the surrounding areas.  McLennan Community College has also partnered with Tarleton State University, Texas Tech University, University of Texas Medical Branch in Galveston, and Midwestern State University to offer more than 50 bachelor's or master's degrees.

1896 Crash at Crush
It was established to stage a publicity stunt concocted by William George Crush and the Missouri-Kansas-Texas Railroad. The stunt involved the collision of two 35-ton steam locomotives in front of spectators, whom the railway transported to the event for $2 each. After strong promotion, on September 15, 1896, the event was delayed by an hour as the police maneuvered the crowd of more than 40,000 back to what was thought to be a safe distance.

The crews of the two engines tied the throttles open and jumped off. The boilers exploded and sent steam and flying debris into the crowd. Three people were killed and about six were injured, including event photographer Jarvis "Joe" Deane, who lost an eye because of a flying bolt.

Ragtime composer Scott Joplin commemorated the event with "The Great Crush Collision March"; Joplin dedicated the composition to the Missouri-Kansas-Texas Railway. Texas composer and singer Brian Burns wrote and recorded a song about the collision, "The Crash at Crush" (2001).

West fertilizer plant explosion

Waco siege

Twin Peaks biker shootout

On May 17, 2015, motorcycle clubs gathered at the Twin Peaks Restaurant in Waco for a Confederation of Clubs meeting.  Upon arrival of a large contingent of the Bandidos Motorcycle Club, mass violence erupted in the parking lot of Twin Peaks between members of the Bandidos and members of the Cossasks Motorcycle Club. This resulted in 9 dead and 18 wounded in the melee between the rival outlaw motorcycle gangs.  In 2019, all remaining charges were dropped by the new District Attorney, Barry Johnson.

Elected leadership

Politics
Similar to other counties in the Texas Triangle with mid sized cities, the county is reliably Republican in the last half century, having last voted Democratic in 1976, however, despite this, Joe Biden did win the city of Waco by about two points while the county as a whole remained above 60% for Trump. The city might be leaning more towards Democratic candidates, but the county is still reliably red.  In the most recent non-presidential election (November 2022), county-wide contested Republican candidates ranged from 64 to 75 percent of the vote.

Geography

Major highways
  Interstate 35
  U.S. Highway 77
  U.S. Highway 84
  State Highway 6
  State Highway 31
  State Highway 164
  State Highway 317

Adjacent counties
 Hill County (north)
 Limestone County (east)
 Falls County (southeast)
 Bell County (south)
 Coryell County (southwest)
 Bosque County (northwest)

Demographics

Note: the US Census treats Hispanic/Latino as an ethnic category. This table excludes Latinos from the racial categories and assigns them to a separate category. Hispanics/Latinos can be of any race.

As of the 2020 US Census,  260,579 people, 94,194 households resided in the county.  The population density was 205 people per square mile (79/km2).  The county now has 107,229 housing units, that are 59.2% owner-occupied with a median value of $165,400.  The racial makeup of the county was 79.7% White, 14.9% Black or African American, 1.2% Native American, 1.8% Asian, 0.1% Pacific Islander, and 2.3% from two or more races. About 27.6% of the population was Hispanic or Latino of any race; 12.8% were of German, 11.0% American, 8.0% English, and 6.9% Irish ancestry.

In the county, the population was distributed as 24.4% under the age of 18, and 15.0% who were 65 years of age or older.  The county is composed of 51% female and 49% male residents.

The median income for a household in the county was $53,723. The per capita income for the county in 2010 was $17,174, and in 2020 was $28,421.  Approximately 14.7% of the population were below the poverty line.

Education

Colleges
 Baylor University
 McLennan Community College
 Texas State Technical College

Public school districts

 Axtell Independent School District
 Bosqueville Independent School District
 China Spring Independent School District
 Crawford Independent School District
 Connally Independent School District
 Gholson Independent School District
 Hallsburg Independent School District
 La Vega Independent School District
 Lorena Independent School District
 Mart Independent School District
 McGregor Independent School District
 Midway Independent School District
 Moody Independent School District
 Oglesby Independent School District
 Riesel Independent School District
 Robinson Independent School District
 Valley Mills Independent School District
 Waco Independent School District
 West Independent School District

Communities

Cities (multiple counties)
 Bruceville-Eddy (small part in Falls County)
 Golinda (mostly in Falls County)
 Mart (small part in Limestone County)
 McGregor (small part in Coryell County)
 Valley Mills (mostly in Bosque County)

Cities

 Bellmead
 Beverly Hills
 Crawford
 Gholson
 Hallsburg
 Hewitt
 Lacy Lakeview
 Leroy
 Lorena
 Moody
 Riesel
 Robinson
 Ross
 Waco (county seat)
 West
 Woodway

Census-designated place
 China Spring

Unincorporated communities
 Axtell
 Elm Mott
 Ocee
 Speegleville

See also

 List of museums in Central Texas
 National Register of Historic Places listings in McLennan County Texas
 Recorded Texas Historic Landmarks in McLennan County
 Texas Triangle

References

External links

 
 McLennan County in Handbook of Texas Online at the University of Texas
 Read Neil McLennan's entry in the Biographical Encyclopedia of Texas hosted by the Portal to Texas History.

 
1850 establishments in Texas
Populated places established in 1850